This is a list of Florida suffragists, suffrage groups and others associated with the cause of women's suffrage in Florida.

Groups 

Florida Equal Franchise League, formed 1912.
Florida Woman Suffrage Association, formed in January 1893.
Men's Suffrage League of Orlando, created March 1914.
Milton Equal Suffrage League, formed in 1914.
National Woman's Party.
 Orlando Suffrage League, formed 1913.
Pensacola Equal Suffrage League, created in 1914.
Political Equality Club, created in February 1913.

Suffragists 

 Frances Anderson (Jacksonville).
Elizabeth Askew (Tampa).
Jessie M. Bartlett (St. Petersburg).
Mary McLeod Bethune (Daytona Beach).
Caroline Mays Brevard (Brevard County).
Mary Elizabeth Bryan (Miami).
Ella C. Chamberlain (Tampa).
Roselle Cooley (Jacksonville).
Hannah Detwiller.
Marjory Stoneman Douglas (Miami).
Zena Dreier (Fellsmere).
Katherine Livingstone Eagan (Jacksonville).
Nellie Glenn (Melrose).
Emma Hainer (Orlando).
May Mann Jennings.
Mary Belle Jewett (Winter Haven).
Minnie Kehoe.
 Mary A. Nolan (Jacksonville).
 Julia Norris (Tampa).
Edith Owen Stoner (Jacksonville).
Mary A. Safford (Orlando).
John Schnarr (Orlando).
Helen Starbuck (Orlando).
Ivy Stranahan (Fort Lauderdale).
Emma Tebbitts (Crescent City).
Helen Hunt West (Jacksonville).
Lillian C. West (Bay County).
Eartha M. M. White (Jacksonville).

Politicians who supported women's suffrage 

 James L. Giles (Orlando).
 E. F. Sperry (Orlando).

Suffragists who campaigned in Florida 

 Susan B. Anthony.
Lucy Burns.
Anne Dallas Dudley.
Lavinia Engle.
Jean Gordon.
Kate M. Gordon.
Louisine Havemeyer.
Pattie R. Jacobs.
Florence Kelley.
Maria McMahon.
Alice Paul.
Jeanette Rankin.
Anna Howard Shaw.
Sue White.

Anti-suffragists in Florida 

 Frank Clark (Gainesville).

See also 

 Timeline of women's suffrage in Florida
 Women's suffrage in Florida
 Women's suffrage in states of the United States
 Women's suffrage in the United States

References

Sources 

 

Florida suffrage

Florida suffragists
Activists from Florida
History of Florida
suffragists